Immanuel Lutheran School may refer to:

In Australia;
Immanuel Lutheran Primary School, Novar Gardens, South Australia, on List of schools in South Australia
Immanuel Lutheran School, Gawler East, South Australia, on List of schools in South Australia

In the United States of America;
Immanuel Lutheran School, Riverside, California
Immanuel Lutheran School, Valparaiso, Indiana
Immanuel Lutheran School, Saginaw, Michigan, on List of schools in Saginaw, Michigan
Immanuel Lutheran School, Mankato, Minnesota, on List of high schools in Minnesota
Immanuel Lutheran School (Perryville, Missouri)
Immanuel Lutheran School, St. Charles, Missouri
Immanuel Lutheran School, Wentzville, Missouri
Immanuel Lutheran School (Greenville, Wisconsin)
Immanuel Lutheran School, Mankato, Wisconsin, a building designed by architect Albert Schippel

See also
 Immanuel Lutheran College (disambiguation)